Olivier III de Clisson (1280–1320), was a Breton Marche Lord and knight.

Lord of Southern Brittany 
Olivier III continued expanding the de Clisson influence outside Brittany and in 1299, married Isabeau de Craon (1278 - July 30, 1350), daughter of Maurice VI de Craon. The Lords of Craon were mainly Norman with a history as former adversaries of the Dukes of Brittany.

This Olivier III was now also son and heir of Jeanne Bertran, lady of Tuit, eldest daughter of Guillaume Bertran, lord of Tuit and Thury, a rich Norman heritage.

References

1280 births
1320 deaths
People from Loire-Atlantique
13th-century Breton people